Melanothrix semperi is a moth in the family Eupterotidae. It was described by Rothschild in 1917. It is found in the Philippines (Mindanao).

The wings of the adults are similar to Melanothrix nymphaliaria, but are less black. The abdomen is yellow with black transverse bands.

References

Moths described in 1917
Eupterotinae
Insects of the Philippines